The Episcopal Diocese of Western Massachusetts is the diocese of the Episcopal Church in the United States of America in the five western counties of Massachusetts. Formed from a division of the Episcopal Diocese of Massachusetts, it was officially recognized at the organizing convention of November 10, 1901. At a special meeting on January 22, 1902, Alexander Hamilton Vinton, Rector of All Saints Church in Worcester, Massachusetts, was elected first diocesan bishop.

The first two Anglican parishes in what would become the diocese were started in Great Barrington in 1762 and Lanesborough in 1767 on the Housatonic River, at first served by priests from the Episcopal Diocese of Connecticut.

There are 67 congregations in the diocese. The Episcopal See is in the city of Springfield, Massachusetts. Since 1929, the cathedral has been Christ Church Cathedral, which was built in 1874.

Shareholder activism 

After the February, 2018 Stoneman Douglas High School shooting, on July 12, 2018 a resolution proposed by Western Massachusetts Episcopal Bishop Douglas John Fisher on a national plan to invest in firearms manufacturers and retailers as a form of shareholder advocacy was approved by the House of Bishops during the 79th meeting of the General Convention of the Episcopal Church in the United States of America in Austin, Texas. The Episcopal Diocese of Western Massachusetts purchased 200 shares, the minimum holding needed to qualify to formally submit shareholder resolutions, of Springfield, Massachusetts-based firearms manufacturer American Outdoor Brands Corporation (AOBC), the parent company of Smith & Wesson. The Diocese partnered with the Adrian Dominican Sisters on a shareholder resolution asking AOBC to report to investors regarding the steps they are taking to reduce gun violence. On February 8, 2019 AOBC released a 20-page report, which said, in summary, "AOBC’s reputation among firearm buyers and Second Amendment supporters is more critical to the success of the Company and the enhancement of shareholder value than its reputation among industry detractors and special interest groups with a political agenda."

Companion diocese
 Anglican Diocese of Kumasi

Bishops
 Alexander Hamilton Vinton (1902–11) 
 Thomas Frederick Davies (1911–36)
 William Appleton Lawrence (1937–57) 
 Robert McConnell Hatch (1957–70)
 Alexander Doig Stewart (1970–84)
 Andrew F. Wissemann (1984–92) 
 Robert S. Denig (1993–95)
 Gordon Paul Scruton (1996–2012)
 Douglas John Fisher (2012–present)

See also

 List of Succession of Bishops for the Episcopal Church, USA

References

External links
Episcopal Diocese of Western Massachusetts
Christ Church Cathedral
Web site of the Episcopal Church
Journal of the Annual Meeting of the Convention, Diocese of Western Massachusetts

Western Massachusetts
Diocese of Western Massachusetts
Christian organizations established in 1901
Province 1 of the Episcopal Church (United States)